The 1973 Lady Gotham Tournament was a women's tennis tournament played on indoor hard courts at the Felt Forum in New York City, United States. The event was part of the USLTA Circuit of the 1973 Virginia Slims WTA Tour and was held from March 28 through April 1, 1973. Only a singles competition was played. Second-seeded Chris Evert won the title and earned $8,000 first-prize money.

Finals

Singles
 Chris Evert defeated  Katja Ebbinghaus 6–0, 6–4
 It was Evert's 3rd singles title of the year and the 14th of her career.

References

Lady Gotham Tournament
Lady Gotham Tournament
Lady Gotham Tournament
Lady Gotham Tournament